New Town is the 27th studio album by the folk band Jandek. It was released in 1998 on Corwood Industries. The album consists of Jandek's vocals and mostly guitar instrumentation.

Track listing

Reviews

External links
Seth Tisue's New Town review

Jandek albums
Corwood Industries albums
1998 albums